Merter Yüce (born 18 February 1985) is a retired Turkish professional footballer who played as a defensive midfielder.

References

External links
 
 
 

1985 births
Living people
People from Bornova
Turkish footballers
Altay S.K. footballers
Kayserispor footballers
Kayseri Erciyesspor footballers
Giresunspor footballers
Kardemir Karabükspor footballers
Akhisarspor footballers
Bursaspor footballers
Fatih Karagümrük S.K. footballers
Süper Lig players
TFF First League players
Association football midfielders